The 2005–06 Indiana Pacers season was the 30th season completed by the Indiana Pacers in the National Basketball Association (NBA). This was also the Pacers first since the 1986-87 season that All-Star guard Reggie Miller was not on the roster as he retired following the 2004-05 season.

Draft Selections

Season summary

In Summer 2005, the Pacers introduced new, completely re-designed jerseys to replace the pinstripe jerseys that they had worn since 1997. However, the pinstripe jerseys continued to be worn through the pre-season, while the new jerseys debuted at the regular season opener, a win against the Orlando Magic on November 2.

The Pacers made a major move for the 2005–06 season by signing Šarūnas Jasikevičius, the floor leader of two-time defending Euroleague champions Maccabi Tel Aviv.

The first game of the 2005–06 season was Ron Artest's first game back with his team after his suspension the previous year for his role in the November 19, 2004, brawl between Pacers players and Pistons fans.

In 2005, the Pacers got off to an average start. On December 10, 2005, Ron Artest told a reporter for the Indianapolis Star that he wanted to be traded, saying "the team would be better off without me". Various Pacers, including Jermaine O'Neal, soon denounced him, as O'Neal did not want to talk about it. On December 12, the Pacers placed Artest on their inactive list and began seeking a trade for the troubled star. On December 16, the NBA fined Ron Artest $10,000 for publicly demanding a trade, which is similar to "degrading the league".

After that, the team had gone on a 9-12 tailspin and was 22-22, a far cry from the beginning where people mentioned that the Pacers would be one of the NBA's elite. On January 24, 2006, it was said that Artest would be traded to the Sacramento Kings for Predrag Stojaković, when the trade was declined suddenly without any explanation. The following day, however, the trade was accepted, and Indiana finally cut ties with the troubled All-Star. On February 1, 2006, they managed to beat the Kobe Bryant-led Lakers, keeping the high-scorer below his average. Jermaine O'Neal was also sidelined with a torn left groin and missed two months. The Pacers finished the season 41-41.

Despite the Artest saga and many key injuries the Pacers made the playoffs for the 14th time in 15 years. They also were the only road team to win Game 1 of a first-round playoff series. However New Jersey won game 2 to tie the series at 1-1 heading back to Indiana. In game 3 Jermaine O'Neal scored 37 points as the Pacers regained a 2-1 series lead. The Nets, however, won games four and five to take a 3-2 series lead. In Game 6 Anthony Johnson scored 40 points but the Pacers' season came to an end as the Nets won 96-90. The 2005–06 season was the last time the Indiana Pacers qualified for the NBA playoffs until the 2010–11 NBA season.

On March 30, during a game against the Phoenix Suns, the Pacers organization honored Reggie Miller by retiring his #31 jersey, and presenting him with a Bentley Continental GT. Miller had spent his entire 18-year career with the Pacers and had retired following the 2004–05 season.

Regular season

Season standings

Game log

Roster

Playoffs

|- align="center" bgcolor="#ccffcc"
| 1
| April 23
| @ New Jersey
| W 90–88
| Stephen Jackson (19)
| Jeff Foster (9)
| Anthony Johnson (6)
| Continental Airlines Arena18,752
| 1–0
|- align="center" bgcolor="#ffcccc"
| 2
| April 25
| @ New Jersey
| L 75–90
| Anthony Johnson (16)
| Jeff Foster (9)
| Johnson, Jones (4)
| Continental Airlines Arena18,472
| 1–1
|- align="center" bgcolor="#ccffcc"
| 3
| April 27
| New Jersey
| W 107–95
| Jermaine O'Neal (37)
| Jermaine O'Neal (15)
| Anthony Johnson (8)
| Conseco Fieldhouse14,706
| 2–1
|- align="center" bgcolor="#ffcccc"
| 4
| April 29
| New Jersey
| L 88–97
| Jermaine O'Neal (22)
| Danny Granger (8)
| three players tied (4)
| Conseco Fieldhouse16,401
| 2–2
|- align="center" bgcolor="#ffcccc"
| 5
| May 2
| @ New Jersey
| L 86–92
| Jermaine O'Neal (19)
| Danny Granger (12)
| Stephen Jackson (7)
| Continental Airlines Arena18,804
| 2–3
|- align="center" bgcolor="#ffcccc"
| 6
| May 4
| New Jersey
| L 90–96
| Anthony Johnson (40)
| Jermaine O'Neal (6)
| Anthony Johnson (5)
| Conseco Fieldhouse16,586
| 2–4
|-

Player statistics

Season

Playoffs

Player Statistics Citation:

Awards and records
 Jermaine O'Neal, NBA All-Star Game
 Ron Artest, NBA All-Defensive First Team
 Danny Granger, NBA All-Rookie Second Team

Roster changes

Additions

Subtractions

References

Indiana Pacers seasons